The Federal Parliament of Nepal is the bicameral federal and supreme legislature of Nepal established in 2018. It consists of the National Assembly and the House of Representatives as parallel houses.

History

Legislatures of Kingdom of Nepal

The former Parliament of Nepal was dissolved by King Gyanendra in 2002, on the grounds that it was incapable of handling the Maoist rebels. The country's five main political parties had staged protests against the king, arguing that he must either call fresh elections or reinstate the elected legislature. In 2004, the king announced that parliamentary elections would be held within twelve months; in April 2006, in response to major pro-democratic protests, it was announced that Parliament would be reestablished.

Interim Legislature of Nepal

After the success of the April 2006 people's movement, on 15 January 2007, the old parliament was dissolved and replaced by a 330-member interim legislature of Nepal. The legislature drafted an interim constitution and a constituent assembly election was held in April 2008. The 601-member assembly on 28 May 2008 abolished the 238-year-old monarchy and declared the country a republic. The constituent assembly, which was initially given two years to draft a new constitution, was dissolved on 27 May 2012 after its failure to draft a new constitution due to differences over restructuring the state.

Legislature Parliament of Nepal

The second Nepalese Constituent Assembly was converted into a legislative parliament of Nepal after the promulgation of the constitution on 20 September 2015. The second Nepalese Constituent Assembly was formed after the failure of the first Constituent Assembly to draft a new constitution. The Legislature Parliament of Nepal was dissolved on 21 January 2018 (7 Magh, 2074 BS).

Composition 
According to the Constitution of Nepal 2015, Nepal has a two-chamber parliament, consisting of the House of Representatives and the National Assembly, with the President of Nepal acting as their head.

President of Nepal 
The President of the Federal Democratic Republic of Nepal is the head of state of Nepal and commander in chief of the Nepalese Armed Forces. The office was created in May 2008 after the country was declared as a republic. The first President of Nepal was Ram Baran Yadav. The current president is Bidhya Devi Bhandari, elected in October 2015. She is the first female president of the country. The President is to be formally addressed as "The Right Honourable".

House of Representatives 
The House of Representatives has 275 members. 165 members are elected from single-member constituencies by first-past-the-post voting and 110 elected through proportional electoral system where voters vote for political parties, considering the whole country as a single election constituency. The members of the house hold their seats for five years or until the body is dissolved by the President on the advice of the council of ministers.

National Assembly 
The National Assembly has 59 members. Eight members are elected from each of the seven provinces by an electoral college of each province, and three are appointed by the President on recommendation of the government. They must include at least three women, one Dalit, and one member from disabled groups. Members serve staggered six year terms such that the term of one-third members expires every two years.

Parliamentary committees
There are 16 thematic committees in the federal parliament: ten in the House of Representatives, four in the National Assembly and two joint committees.

House of Representatives 

 Finance
 International Relations
 Industry, Commerce, Labour and Consumer Interest
 Law, Justice, and Human Rights
 Agriculture, Cooperative and Natural Resources
 Women and Social
 State Affairs
 Development and Technology
 Education and Health
 Public Account

National Assembly 

 Sustainable Development and Good Governance
 Legislative Management
 Delegated Legislation and Government Assurances
 National Interest and coordination among members

Joint 

 Parliamentary Hearing
 State Direction, Principle Rules and Responsibility

Women's representation 

The constitution of Nepal guarantees a 33% reservation for women in all public offices including the federal parliament. On 16 March 2018, Dr. Shiva Maya Tumbahamphe was elected as the deputy speaker of the house. Women's representation in the parliament has increased since the Constituent Assembly, which eventually guaranteed provisions for women's representation on the constitution.

Parliament House
Both houses of the federal parliament currently meet at the International Convention Centre in New Baneshwor, Kathmandu.

A new parliament building is being constructed in the premises of the Singha Durbar complex, which houses most government offices.

See also

Politics of Nepal
List of legislatures by country

Explanatory notes

References

External links
Official website
National Assembly Nepal Website
House of Representative Nepal Website

Politics of Nepal
Government of Nepal
Nepal
Nepal
2015 establishments in Nepal
Nepal
Parliament of Nepal